Lisa Joy Millar (born 19 February 1969) is an Australian television news presenter and journalist.

Millar is currently co-host of the ABC's breakfast program News Breakfast alongside Michael Rowland.

She has previously been a foreign correspondent for ABC News based in London and Washington DC.

Career 
Millar began her journalism career in newspapers, with a cadetship for The Gympie Times and then Brisbane's afternoon tabloid newspaper, The Sun, until it closed down in late 1991.

Lisa next moved north to Townsville, where she worked for the regional television broadcaster, WIN TV, for a year, after which she crossed to the ABC as its North Queensland correspondent, covering a large area stretching from Torres Strait to the outback mining community of Mount Isa, and down to the Whitsunday island chain. Millar then worked in the federal Press Gallery in Canberra for the ABC, including during the 1996 Federal Election campaign, which saw John Howard become Prime Minister.

Millar moved back to Queensland where she became ABC's state political reporter, covering the rise of Pauline Hanson and her party, One Nation. She was elected president of the 30-strong Brisbane press gallery and was co-anchor of the ABC's state election coverage in 1998 and 2001. Lisa also reported for ABC Radio in Queensland and was a regular commentator on Queensland issues for 702 ABC Sydney.

In 2001, Millar was assigned as the ABC's North American correspondent, based in Washington, before returning to Australia in 2005. She was part of the team that won the 2005 Walkley Award for Investigative Journalism for the story that discovered Vivian Solon in the Philippines.

In 2007, Lisa was awarded an Ochberg Fellowship by the Dart Center for Journalism and Trauma for creating a DVD to assist journalists who experience grief or trauma.

In July 2009, Millar returned to Washington to become the ABC's North American Bureau Chief and held that position for six years. In 2012, she spent several months on assignment to the ABC's Europe bureau in London, covering the Olympic Games and other major stories, before returning to the Washington bureau.

In April 2015, ABC announced that Millar would replace Philip Williams as Bureau Chief of the ABC's London bureau from September. In October 2018, Millar returned to Australia to take up a roving reporter/presenter role with the ABC.

In December 2018, Millar joined News Breakfast as co-host whilst Virginia Trioli was on long service leave. She filled in on the program until Trioli returned in April 2019.

In June 2019, it was announced that Millar would succeed Virginia Trioli as co-host of News Breakfast, commencing on the 19 August 2019.

In June 2022, Millar apologised after viewers took offence at her comments during a discussion about racism in sport. While discussing Nick Kyrgios' allegations that he was subjected to racial taunts at the Stuttgart Open, Millar appeared to suggest that there would be some people who would assert that athletes such as Kyrgios should be able to ignore taunts from spectators.

Twitter abuse
In September 2021, Millar deactivated her Twitter account due to "voluminous daily bullying, including trolling about her late father" according to ABC colleague Leigh Sales. Millar said that while Twitter remains a useful platform for breaking news, she struggled to balance that against the high level of animosity personally directed towards her on the site. She also said the barrage of abuse she received on Twitter was "very wearing".  Millar is one of a number of Australian media personalities who have been victims of personal abuse directed at them on Twitter.  Notably, Q+A host Hamish Macdonald also left Twitter in January 2021 due to the abuse he received on the platform, before leaving the talk program entirely in July 2021.

Despite leaving Twitter, Millar has continued to be the focus of trolls who regularly abuse and attack her on social media.

In March 2023, Millar was the subject of commentary, which she described as "obnoxious" and "foul disgusting personal abuse", relating to what she wore while co-hosting News Breakfast on 6 March 2023. The ABC also criticised The Daily Mail and news.com.au for their stories about the abuse Millar received on social media which included publishing screenshots. In a statement, the ABC said: "If Daily Mail Australia and news.com.au were genuine in their concern about such behaviour they wouldn’t amplify it by republishing the comments they describe as “vile” and “sickening”, accompanied by a screenshot. Giving anonymous social media bullies publicity on a national platform is participating in perpetuating antisocial behaviour and the very serious issue of online abuse of women."

Personal life 
Millar grew up in the small country town of Kilkivan in Queensland; her father was the National Party MP Clarrie Millar.

Lisa had previously been married to journalist Sid Maher.

References

External links
 Profile at ABC News
 

ABC radio (Australia) journalists and presenters
Australian reporters and correspondents
Australian women journalists
Australian radio journalists
Australian political journalists
Living people
Women radio journalists
1969 births